Leroy Orange (born 20 July 1950 in Chicago, Illinois), on 12 January 1984 he was arrested along with his half-brother, Leonard Kidd, for the murder of four persons (Ricardo Pedro, 25, Michelle Jointer, 30, Renee Coleman, 27, and Coleman's 10-year-old son, Tony) at 1553 W 91st Street in Chicago's South side Brainerd neighborhood based on false accusations by Kidd.  Leroy Orange was convicted on the basis of a confession he gave after being tortured in Chicago's Area 2 police station under the direction of Commander Jon Burge. Leroy confessed to a murder after police placed a plastic bag over his head and applied electric shocks to his testicles. Burge was thrown off the force in 1993 for directing the torture of scores of people in custody. 

Orange eventually confessed to the murders after twelve hours of interrogation and alleged torture at the hands of Chicago Police Lieutenant Jon Burge.
At trial, despite Kidd's testimony on the witness stand that he had acted alone, Orange was convicted due in a large part to representation by Earl Washington, a private attorney retained by Orange's family accused of gross incompetence during the trial.

After several appeals that were being forestalled on technicalities, the Bluhm Legal Clinic Director Thomas F. Geraghty and clinic students entered the case.

On 10 January 2003 Illinois Governor George Ryan granted Orange a full pardon based on innocence, criticizing prosecutors and the judiciary for relying on "procedural technicalities at the exclusion of the quest for truth".

Leroy Orange was subsequently arrested for attempting to sell crack cocaine to an undercover police officer.

See also
 List of wrongful convictions in the United States

References

External links
Northwestern University Center on Wrongful Convictions Article

1950 births
People from Chicago
Recipients of American gubernatorial pardons
American drug traffickers
Living people
Overturned convictions in the United States
American people wrongfully convicted of murder